The Songs of Robert Wyatt and Antony & the Johnsons, the fifth album by English folk group the Unthanks and the first to be recorded live, was released on 28 November 2011. Its extended title is: Diversions Vol. 1: The Songs of Robert Wyatt and Antony & the Johnsons: Live from the Union Chapel, London.

The album, which consists entirely of songs by Robert Wyatt and by Antony Hegarty (now known as Anohni) of Antony and the Johnsons,  was recorded at the Union Chapel, Islington, London, on 8 and 9 December 2010. It received a 4.5-starred review in Rolling Stone, four-starred reviews in The Guardian and The Observer and four-starred ratings from AllMusic and musicOMH.

Reception
David Fricke, in a  4.5-starred review for Rolling Stone magazine, said there is "a silvery deceptive spine running through the sisters' Earth-angel voices". In a four-starred review, Neil Spencer of The Observer called the album "[a] triumphant excursion", adding that "...the Unthanks' intertwining voices – cadent, mournful, tender – never falter and the between-songs banter ('There will be clog dancing!') grounds an ethereal atmosphere".  Robin Denselow, in a four-starred review for The Guardian, described the album as "a thoughtful, delicate and bravely original tribute to two fine contemporary songwriters". Reviewing the album for BBC Music, Martin Aston was struck by "hearing You Are My Sister sung to each other by sisters in blood as well as spirit, the arrangement and tone touching rather than cloying".

Writing in The Independent on Sunday, Nick Coleman said that "The Hegarty songs respond slightly better to the treatment than do Wyatt's, with the exception of 'Sea Song'." In a  four-starred review for musicOMH, Chris White said: "In a largely flawless set, the Antony & The Johnsons songs in particular are luminously beautiful, perfectly suited to the sisters’ passionate, breathy vocals and McNally's elegant arrangements" but felt that the Unthanks are "at their best when providing a mixed palette of the centuries-old music of their native county and their own unique takes on the work of some of today’s most interesting performers. Just focusing on the latter, they’re marginally less interesting."

In a four-starred review for AllMusic, James Christopher Monger described it as "one of the more riveting and idiosyncratic tribute albums of the past ten years". Alex Young, reviewing the album for Consequence of Sound, said: "Rachel and Becky Unthank convey the intensity of Antony and the Johnsons, as well as Wyatt’s weariness. This kind of tribute doesn’t come about often enough, and they’ve nailed it, letting the lyricism and emotionality ring out".

Track listing
Antony and the Johnsons songs 
 "Bird Guhl" (Antony Hegarty) from I Am a Bird Now (3:57)
 "Man is the Baby" (Antony Hegarty) from I Am a Bird Now (5:43)
 "You Are My Sister"  (Antony Hegarty) from I Am a Bird Now (5:56)
 "For Today I Am a Boy"  (Antony Hegarty) from I Am a Bird Now (4:06)
 "Paddy's Gone"  (Antony Hegarty) from I Am a Bird Now (4:13)
 "Spiralling"  (Antony Hegarty) from I Am a Bird Now (4:41)
Robert Wyatt songs
 "Stay Tuned" (Anja Garbarek) from Comicopera (4:43)
 "Dondestan" (Robert Wyatt) from Dondestan (Revisited) (3:18)
 "Lullaby for Hamza" (Robert Wyatt/Alfreda Benge) from Cuckooland (3:44)
 "Lisp Service" (Hugh Hopper/Robert Wyatt) from Dondestan (Revisited)  (3:11)
 "Free Will and Testament" (Wyatt/Kramer) from Shleep (5:03)
 "Out of the Blue" (Wyatt/Elfriede Ellidge) from Comicopera (4:11)
 "Cuckoo Madame" (Wyatt/Benge) from Cuckooland  (5:13)
 "Sea Song" (Wyatt) from Rock Bottom (6:59)
 "Forest" (excerpt) (Wyatt/Benge) from Cuckooland (2:51)

Total album length = 1:07:44

Personnel
The Unthanks
 Rachel Unthank – voice, feet, dulcitone
 Becky Unthank – voice, feet
 Adrian McNally – piano on Robert Wyatt set, drums on Antony set, harmonium, voice
 Chris Price – drums on Robert Wyatt set, electric bass on Antony set, voice
 Niopha Keegan – violin, accordion, voice

Additional musicians
 Ros Stephen – violin, voice
 Becca Spencer – viola, voice
 Jo Silverston – cello, voice
 Lizzie Jones – trumpet, voice
 Dean Ravera – double bass
 Jonny Kearney – piano on Antony set

Arrangements
Strings on Antony set transcribed by Niopha Keegan
Strings on "Stay Tuned" by Niopha Keegan
Strings on "Lisp Service" by Jo Silverston
Strings on "Out of the Blue" by Becca Spencer and Lizzie Jones

Production and design 
The album, which was recorded live at the Union Chapel, Islington, London on 8 and 9 December 2010, was mixed and produced by Adrian McNally. It was mastered by Denis Blackham. The tri-fold album cover, designed by Steven Wainwright, incorporates illustrations by Becky Unthank and photographs by Mark Winpenny.

Notes

References

External links
 The Unthanks: official website

2011 live albums
Albums produced by Adrian McNally
Live albums recorded at Union Chapel, Islington
Rough Trade Records live albums
The Unthanks albums